Bedknobs and Broomsticks is a stage musical based on the 1971 Walt Disney film and the stories by Mary Norton. It features the original songs by Richard M. Sherman and Robert B. Sherman, new songs and additional music and lyrics by Neil Bartram and book by Brian Hill.

Background 
The musical was originally due to premiere at The Yard at Chicago Shakespeare Theater from May 30 to July 28, 2019 as part of its 2018/19 season, directed and choreographed by Rachel Rockwell, however due to Rockwell's death on May 26, 2018 the musical had been postponed and replaced with a production of Six.

In May 2020 while speaking about the closure of Frozen on Broadway to The New York Times, Thomas Schumacher, the president of Disney Theatrical Productions, confirmed the musical was in development with new directors Candice Edmunds and Jamie Harrison.

Production history

2021-22 UK and Ireland tour 
The musical had its world premiere at the Theatre Royal in Newcastle upon Tyne on 14 August 2021 before embarking on a UK and Ireland tour until May 2022. The production is directed by Candice Edmunds and Jamie Harrison, with set design and illusions also by Jamie Harrison. Costume design is by Gabriella Slade, orchestrations are by Simon Hale, musical supervision is by Tom Murray, choreography and movement direction are by Neil Bettles, sound design is by Gareth Fry, lighting is by Simon Wilkinson, production management is by Gary Beestone, and casting by Jill Green and Jo Hawes.

The production is produced by Michael Harrison by special arrangement with Disney Theatrical Productions. Casting for the production was announced on 4 June 2021 including Dianne Pilkington as Miss Price and Charles Brunton as Emelius Browne.

Cast and characters

Musical Numbers

Act I
"Prologue"
"Nobody's Problems" - Charlie, Carrie, Paul
"Miss Price, I Believe" - Carrie, Paul, Charlie
"A Step In The Right Direction" - Miss Price, Company
"Negotiality" - Charlie
"Filigree, Apogee, Pedigree, Perigee" - Miss Price, Company
"Bedknob Spell" - Miss Price, Company
"The Age of Not Believing" - Miss Price
"Bedknob Spell (Reprise 1)" - Miss Price, Company
"Emelius The Great" - Emelius, Company
"Filigree, Apogee, Pedigree, Perigee (Reprise)" - Miss Price, Company
"Bedknob Spell (Reprise 2)" - Miss Price, Company
"Eglantine" - Emelius, Charlie, Miss Price, Carrie, Paul
"Bedknob Spell (Reprise 3)" - Miss Price, Paul, Company
"Portobello Road" - Full Company
"Negotiality (Reprise 1)" - Charlie
"Bedknob Spell (Reprise 4)" - Miss Price, Carrie, Paul, Company

Act II
"Entr'acte"
"Nopeepo Lagoon" - Norton, Company
"The Beautiful Briny" - Miss Price, Emelius, Charlie, Carrie, Paul, Company
"Fish, Fish" - Sherman
"Negotiality (Reprise 2)" - Charlie
"Emelius and Eglantine" - Miss Price, Emelius, Charlie, Carrie, Paul
"Substitutiary Locomotion" - Miss Price, Emelius, Charlie, Carrie, Paul, Company
"Nobody's Problems (Quintet)" - Miss Price, Emelius, Charlie, Carrie, Paul
"It's Now" - Emelius
"The Age of Not Believing (Reprise)" - Charlie
"Onward" - Miss Price, Carrie, Charlie, Paul, Emelius, Company
"Epilogue" - Company

References

External links 

 Official website

Musicals based on films
Musicals based on multiple works
Musicals based on novels
Musicals by the Sherman Brothers
2021 musicals
Disney Theatrical Productions musicals